Bach's algorithm is a probabilistic polynomial time algorithm for generating random numbers along with their factorizations, named after its discoverer, Eric Bach. It is of interest because no algorithm is known that efficiently factors numbers, so the straightforward method, namely generating a random number and then factoring it, is impractical.

The algorithm performs, in expectation, O(log n) primality tests.

A simpler, but less efficient algorithm (performing, in expectation,  primality tests), is due to Adam Kalai.

Overview 

Bach's algorithm produces a number  uniformly at random in the range  (for a given input ), along with its factorization. It does this by picking a prime number  and an exponent  such that , according to a certain distribution. This gives  with logarithmic distribution over the desired range; rejection sampling is then used to get a uniform distribution.

References

Further reading
 Bach, Eric. Analytic methods in the Analysis and Design of Number-Theoretic Algorithms, MIT Press, 1984. Chapter 2, "Generation of Random Factorizations", part of which is available online here.

Cryptographic algorithms
Random number generation